Fair Isle Airport , is a small airport located in Fair Isle, Shetland, Scotland. It is owned by the National Trust for Scotland.

Licensing
Fair Isle Aerodrome has a CAA Ordinary Licence (Number P610) that allows flights for the public transport of passengers or for flying instruction as authorised by the licensee (The National Trust For Scotland). The aerodrome is not licensed for night use. Fixed wing aircraft, in particular Britten-Norman Islander aircraft, and helicopters use the airport regularly.

Facilities
The airport has a single runway, designated "06" or "24" depending upon the direction of use. Passenger facilities are very limited, and there are no hangars available, although visiting aircraft can be stabled (open air) overnight for a small fee. There is no airport fire service, but the Fair Isle fire engine is on call for airport incidents, and can be requested in advance by incoming flights with at least 30 minutes' notice.

Airlines and destinations

References

External links
Fair Isle Airport information

Airports in Shetland
Airport